Nay Chi Oo (born Htoo Pyae Sone Myint on 25 January 1992) is a Burmese beauty blogger, actress, make-up artist, fashion model and businesswoman. She is best known for her makeup tutorial videos and her beauty blog, "beautybynaychi" on Facebook. Nay Chi Oo featured on The Myanmar Times "Top 10 Bloggers" list in 2019.

Early life and education
Nay Chi Oo was born on 25 January 1992 in Yangon, Myanmar into a military family. She is the eldest daughter of Myo Myint Sein, a businessman and former military official, and his wife Than Than Swe, a botanist and businesswomen. Nay Chi Oo has a younger sister Sein Lae Yadanar and a younger brother. She attended high school at Practising School Yangon Institute of Education and graduated with GCE Advanced Level from Cambridge Tutors College in 2013, and MSc Forensic Medical Sciences from University of Bradford. While still in university, she has served as Student president of Cambridge Tutors College. She is currently studying MBA at Global MBA University of the Thai Chamber of Commerce.

Career

2017: As a beauty blogger 

Nay Chi Oo using popular social networking website Facebook to her beauty blogger career. In February 2017, she began posting make-up tutorials on Facebook under the page name, beautybynaychi. She regularly posts make-up tutorials, make-up first impressions, beauty tips and product reviews. End of the year, she became one of the most popular beauty bloggers in Myanmar.

Nay Chi Oo participated as a judge in Make me Beautiful by L'Oréal, a reality make-up contest TV show on selected make-up artists in Myanmar, and also in New Face Actor Choice contest of Kha Thone Lone film production in 2018.

2018–present: Acting debut and breaking into the big screen

Rising to fame in 2018, she became an actress. She made her acting debut with a leading in the big-screen film Yan Thu (Rivals), alongside Nay Min and Wutt Hmone Shwe Yi, directed by Mee Phwar in February 2018 which premiered in Myanmar cinemas on 14 December 2018. The film received critical acclaim and positive reviews for her portrayal of Lay Pyay Nu Thway, which led to increased popularity for her.

In June 2018, she starred in her second big-screen film Ae The (The Guest) where she played the leading role with Shwe Htoo and Shwe Hmone Yati, which premiered in Myanmar cinemas on 30 May 2019.

In January 2019, she starred the female lead in the drama Puyi Tha alongside Tyron Bejay, Cham Min Ye Htut and Khine Thin Kyi. The film screened in Myanmar cinemas on 8 August 2019 which received critical acclaim and positive reviews.

Brand ambassadorships
On 15 February 2019, she was appointed as a brand ambassador for Vivo smartphone. That was her first time working as a brand ambassador. On 28 February 2019, she was appointed as a brand ambassador for Air KBZ.

Business
Her family owns many businesses in Myanmar, including Sane Let Tin, one of the country's largest resorts, located in Kyaikto. She is a co-founder of Sane Let Tin which is owned by the military related family.

On 15 November 2018, she launched Your Social Media BFF 2019 year planner book under her own band Beautybynaychilabel.

Political criticism
In the aftermath of the 2021 Myanmar coup d'état, Nay Chi Oo stayed ominously silent for the first few weeks after the coup, only responding after her fans requested her to do so. When she did join the protests, it was with an entourage of bodyguards. She was a target of social boycotts and social punishment movement. She tried to donate to a Civil Disobedience Movement Support charity, and the donation was refunded to her, with the organization saying they didn't want her money. A number of business brands that have collaborated with Nay Chi Oo have announced the end of their partnership.

Filmography

Film (Cinema)

Television series

References

External links

1992 births
Living people
Burmese make-up artists
Burmese film actresses
Burmese female models
21st-century Burmese actresses
People from Yangon